Holzhau is a village in East Germany that has been part of the municipality of Rechenberg-Bienenmühle in the Eastern Ore Mountains since 1994.

Transport 
Holzhau is the terminus of the Freiberg Railway, that is operated by Rhenus Veniro.

References

External links 

Holzhau web page

Mittelsachsen
Villages in the Ore Mountains